Sir John Coode  (11 November 1816 – 2 March 1892), English civil engineer, known for harbour works.

Life
He was born at Bodmin on 11 November 1816. He was educated at Bodmin Grammar School and after leaving school entered his father's office. His natural tastes, however, were not for law but for engineering ; he was therefore articled to James Meadows Rendel of Plymouth, and on completion of his pupilage he worked for some years for that gentleman and on the Great Western Railway.
 
In 1844, he set up in business for himself in Westminster as a consulting engineer, and remained there till 1847. In that year he was appointed resident engineer in charge of the great works at Portland harbour, which had been designed by Rendel. 
On the death of the latter in 1856, Coode was appointed engineer-in-chief, and retained that post until the completion of the work in 1872. 
This harbour provided the largest area of deep water of any artificial harbour in Great Britain, and was a work of the utmost national importance. 
The first stone of the great breakwater was laid by the prince consort on 25 July 1849, and the final stone was put in place by the prince of Wales in 1872, the work having therefore taken twenty-three years to complete and having cost about a million sterling. 
The honour of knighthood was conferred upon Coode in 1872 for his services in connection with this national undertaking.
 
While this work was going on Coode served as a member of the royal commission on harbours of refuge, and also drew out the plans for the harbour which was to be constructed in Table Bay, Cape Town, and for numerous other similar harbour works.
 
He designed the lighthouse at La Corbière in Jersey which was the first lighthouse in the British Isles to be built of reinforced concrete.

He was consulted by several of the most important colonial governments, notably by those of the South African and Australian colonies, in reference to proposed harbour works, and he made several journeys to South Africa, Australia, and India in connection with the schemes upon which his advice was sought. 
In 1876, he was in Cape Colony and in Natal, and again in 1877, and in 1878 and 1885 he paid visits to Australia and New Zealand.

After the Portland Harbour his best-known work is the harbour of Colombo, Ceylon (now Sri Lanka). He was also responsible for the straightening of the lower reaches of the Yarra River in Melbourne, Australia with the resulting district of Coode Island and the Coode Canal named for him, and the design of what became Victoria Dock.
 
He was a member of the royal commission on metropolitan sewage discharge (1882-4), and of the international commission of the Suez Canal ; on the latter he served from 1884 till his death in 1892. 
After he returned from his second visit to the Australian colonies he was made a K.C.M.G. in 1886, in recognition of the distinguished services he had rendered to the empire.
 
Coode was probably the most distinguished harbour engineer of the nineteenth century ; it would be difficult to estimate too highly the value to the trade and mutual intercourse of the different parts of the British empire, of the harbour and river improvement schemes in every part of the world for which he was responsible. He was elected a member of the Institution of Civil Engineers in 1849, served for many years on the council, and was president from May 1889 to May 1891. He was also an active member of the Royal Colonial Institute, and sat on its council from 1881 till his death.
 
Coode died at Brighton on 2 March 1892. He is buried at Kensal Green Cemetery.

Family
He married in 1842 Jane, daughter of William Price of Weston-super-Mare.
 
There is a portrait of him in oil at the Institution of Civil Engineers, and a bust, the property of Mrs. Lillingston, the Vicarage, Havering-atte-Bower, near Romford.

Works
Coode contributed a very valuable paper to the Institution of Civil Engineers in 1852 on the 'Chesil Bank' (Proc. Inst. Civil Eng, xii. 520), and his presidential address to the civil engineers was delivered in 1889.

He wrote many professional reports, chiefly on harbours, the most important of which are Table Bay (Weymouth, 1859); Whitehaven (London, 1866); on military harbours (London, 1875); Table Bay, Mossel Bay, &c. (London, 1877) ; Port Natal (London, 1877) ; Melbourne (London, 1879) ; Report on Harbours and Rivers in Queensland, Mackay (London, 1887); Townsville (London, 1887) ; Report on River Tyne Improvements (London, 1877) ; Report on tidal difficulties on Dee at Chester (Chester, 1891).

References

Attribution

External links

 Coode, John, McMaster Libraries
 Sir John Coode's Harbour, East London harbour development, 1872–1895

        
        
        
        
        
        

1816 births
1892 deaths
Knights Commander of the Order of St Michael and St George
People from Bodmin
Engineers from Cornwall
Presidents of the Institution of Civil Engineers
English canal engineers
Harbour engineers
Lighthouse builders
Burials at Kensal Green Cemetery